Ravinder Singh Bhalla (born January 13, 1974), often simply called Ravi Bhalla, is an American civil rights lawyer, politician, the 39th and current mayor of Hoboken, New Jersey. Prior to becoming mayor, he served in the city council of Hoboken, New Jersey, since 2009. On November 7, 2017, he was elected New Jersey's first Sikh mayor, as well as the first elected mayor in the United States who is a Sikh and wears a turban.

Early life
Ravinder Singh Bhalla was born in Passaic, New Jersey, and raised in Woodland Park (then called West Paterson.) His parents, Ranbir and Harminder Singh, live in Montville, New Jersey, where they own and manage a company that manufactures high-pressure sodium street lamps that Ranbir Singh, a physicist, invented himself.

Bhalla earned a Bachelor of Science degree in political psychology from University of California, Berkeley, a master's degree in public administration and public policy from the London School of Economics, and earned his juris doctor from Tulane University Law School in New Orleans.

Career

Legal practice

Bhalla was a civil rights attorney at the law firm of Florio, Perrucci, Steinhardt & Fader, who have represented NJ Transit.

In a case in 2002, Bhalla represented three high school students at Hunterdon Central High School in Flemington, New Jersey. The high school had implemented a policy of random drug-testing of students participating in any extracurricular activities or who have a parking permit, and the three students filed a lawsuit in New Jersey State Court alleging the school's drug-testing policy violated their rights according to the New Jersey Constitution. The New Jersey state court ruled that the random drug-testing was allowable under the state constitution, pointing to a similar case ruling by a federal court. Bhalla said he disagreed with the state court's ruling, saying that the New Jersey Constitution gives a wider protection against unreasonable search and seizure than the United States Constitution.

In a case in 2003, Bhalla represented Amric Singh Rathour. Rathour had qualified for a job in traffic enforcement with the New York Police Department. Rathour's supervisors fired Rathour because he would not shave his beard or stop wearing his turban, both of which are required by Rathour's religion, Sikhism. On behalf of his client, Bhalla filed a lawsuit in United States District Court for religious discrimination.

Bhalla wrote an amicus curae for the federal court case of married couple Harpal Singh Cheema and Rajwinder Kaur. Cheema had been brutally and repeatedly tortured by Indian police for protesting the Indian government and for giving food and shelter to protesters. Cheema and Kaur had been allowed to enter the U.S. for humanitarian reasons. Their asylum application was later disapproved, and they were trying to fight that decision so they could remain in the U.S. Cheema lost his appeal and was deported to India, where he was arrested at Indira Gandhi International Airport.

In another case, Bhalla represented Gurpreet S. Kherha. A car dealership in Little Falls, New Jersey, refused to employ Kherha because of its policy of prohibiting beards. Kherha's religion, Sikhism, forbids him from shaving his beard. Bhalla filed a religious discrimination complaint with the Equal Employment Opportunity Commission and a lawsuit in New Jersey State Court, stating that the car dealership had violated Kherha's civil rights by refusing him reasonable religious accommodation. The Equal Employment Opportunity Commission determined that Kherha had indeed suffered religious discrimination, and the parties settled the case.

Politics
Bhalla ran for an at-large seat on the Hoboken City Council in 2009 on incumbent mayor Dawn Zimmer's ticket. During Bhalla's campaign, he emphasized fiscal responsibility, slowing down development, increasing the amount of affordable housing, lower city property taxes, and transparency in government. In the election, Bhalla received 13% of the vote, advancing to a runoff election. In the runoff election, Bhalla received 17% of the vote, winning an at-large seat on the Hoboken City Council for a four-year term in office. He was sworn in on July 1, 2009.

Bhalla served as the chairman of the Hoboken Democratic Party from 2010 to 2011. He also served as vice president of the council between 2010 and 2011, and he served as president of the city council from 2011 to 2012.

In 2011, Bhalla ran to represent the 33rd Legislative District in the New Jersey General Assembly. During his campaign, Bhalla emphasized that New Jersey had the highest property taxes in the country, and he advocated for lowering property taxes, offset by an increase to state income taxes. Bhalla focused on creating jobs and strengthening New Jersey's hate crime laws. Bhalla opposed New Jersey Governor Chris Christie's $1.3-billion cuts in the state's education budget. Bhalla called himself an Independent Democrat. Bhalla was defeated in the Democratic primary election, coming in third place, but he has stated that he still has political aspirations to be a legislator at the state or Federal level.

In 2012, following Superstorm Sandy, Bhalla distributed food to people at multiple locations in Hoboken.

Bhalla filed to run again to represent the 33rd District in the New Jersey General Assembly in 2013. The following month, Bhalla withdrew from the election when Carmelo Garcia's candidacy was cleared. Instead Bhalla ran for reelection to the Hoboken City Council. Bhalla received 14% of the vote, giving him a second four-year term in office.

In 2017, Bhalla decided to run for a third term on the Hoboken City Council. When incumbent Hoboken Mayor Dawn Zimmer decided not to run for reelection, she endorsed Bhalla in a surprise press conference. During Bhalla's mayoral campaign, he advocated for response development, open-space initiatives, defending Hoboken's citizens' rights from the Trump administration, fiscal responsibility, holding the line on local taxes, and building a surplus for unanticipated city emergencies. Bhalla won the election with 33% of the vote. His term of office began January 1, 2018.

In 2021 Bhalla ran unopposed for a second term.

Controversies
In 2018, Bhalla was censured by the New Jersey Supreme Court after a disciplinary board chided him for not setting aside over $6,000 for a former employee's retirement account between 2008 and 2009.

Personal life
Bhalla has lived in Hoboken, New Jersey, since 2000. He and his wife, Navneet (also known as Bindya), a human rights attorney, live with their children, Arza and Shabegh.

Electoral results

2009

2011

2013

2017

2021

See also
 Civil rights law
 Indian Americans in New Jersey
 List of mayors of Hoboken
 Sikh Americans

Notes

References

External links

Alumni of the London School of Economics
American mayors of Indian descent
American politicians of Indian descent
Asian-American people in New Jersey politics
American Sikhs
Living people
Mayors of Hoboken, New Jersey
New Jersey Democrats
Politicians from Passaic, New Jersey
Tulane University Law School alumni
UC Berkeley College of Letters and Science alumni
1974 births